This is a list of people executed in the United States in 2002. Seventy-one people were executed in the United States in 2002. Thirty-three of them were in the state of Texas. Two (Lynda Lyon Block and Aileen Carol Wuornos) were female. One (Lynda Lyon Block) was executed via electrocution.

List of people executed in the United States in 2002

Demographics

Executions in recent years

See also
 List of death row inmates in the United States
 List of most recent executions by jurisdiction
 List of people scheduled to be executed in the United States
 List of women executed in the United States since 1976

References

List of people executed in the United States
executed
People executed in the United States
2002